Willie Ernest "Pee Wee" Powell (October 30, 1903 – May 16, 1987) was an American baseball pitcher in the Negro leagues. He played from 1925 to 1934, playing mostly with the Chicago American Giants. He threw a no-hitter in 1927.

References

External links
 and Baseball-Reference Black Baseball stats and Seamheads

1903 births
1987 deaths
Chicago American Giants players
Detroit Stars players
Baseball players from Alabama
People from Eutaw, Alabama
20th-century African-American sportspeople
Baseball pitchers